is a former Japanese football player.

Playing career
Yoshida was born in Hiroshima Prefecture on November 22, 1966. After graduating from Tokai University, he joined Tanabe Pharmaceutical in 1989. He played many matches as defender from first season. In 1991, he moved to his local club Mazda (later Sanfrecce Hiroshima). However he could not play many matches and he moved to Japan Football League club Cosmo Oil (later Cosmo Oil Yokkaichi) in 1995. Although he played as regular player, the club was disbanded end of 1996 season and he retired end of 1996 season.

Club statistics

References

External links

maruniya.net

1966 births
Living people
Tokai University alumni
Association football people from Hiroshima Prefecture
Japanese footballers
Japan Soccer League players
J1 League players
Japan Football League (1992–1998) players
Tanabe Mitsubishi Pharma SC players
Sanfrecce Hiroshima players
Cosmo Oil Yokkaichi FC players
Association football defenders